The discography of the American rapper The D.O.C contains three studio albums and eight singles.

Solo discography

Studio albums

Singles

Promotional singles

Guest appearances

With Fila Fresh Crew

Extended play

Singles

Guest appearances

Music videos

Solo

With Fila Fresh Crew

Guest appearances

Notes

References

Hip hop discographies
Discographies of American artists